John Maron Abowd (born December 22, 1951) is the Associate director for research and methodology and chief scientist of the US Census Bureau, where he serves on leave from his position as the Edmund Ezra Day Professor of Economics, professor of information science, and member of the Department of Statistical Science at Cornell University.

At Cornell, Abowd has taught and conducted research since 1987, including seven years on the faculty of the Johnson Graduate School of Management. Abowd is best known for his contributions in the field of labor economics, and in particular his work in creating, disseminating, and using longitudinal employee-employer matched data.

Career 

Abowd received a BA in economics (with highest honors) from the University of Notre Dame in 1973 and a PhD in economics from the University of Chicago in 1977, under supervision of Arnold Zellner.

Prior to arriving at Cornell University in 1987, Abowd served on the faculty at Princeton University, the University of Chicago, and the Massachusetts Institute of Technology.

In addition to his professorship at Cornell University, Abowd is currently a research associate at the National Bureau of Economic Research (NBER), a research affiliate at the Centre de Recherche en Economie et Statistique (CREST), and a research fellow at the Institute for the Study of Labor (IZA). Abowd is also the director of the Labor Dynamics Institute (LDI) at Cornell.

Abowd is the 2014 president of the Society of Labor Economists. He was chair in 2013 for the Business and Economic Statistics Section and fellow of the American Statistical Association. He is an elected member of the International Statistical Institute (2012). Abowd served as a distinguished senior research fellow at the United States Census Bureau from 1998 to 2012. He also served on the National Academies' Committee on National Statistics from 2010 to 2013 and as director of the Cornell Institute for Social and Economic Research (CISER) from 1999 to 2007.

Abowd has been the principal investigator or co-principal investigator for multiyear grants and contracts from the National Science Foundation, the U.S. Census Bureau, and the Alfred P. Sloan Foundation.

Abowd, along with John Haltiwanger and Julia Lane, received the 2014 Roger Herriot Award from the American Statistical Association for work improving federal data collection, and in particular work developing and disseminating employee-employer matched data through the Census Bureau's LEHD Program.

Current research 

Abowd's current research focuses on the creation, dissemination, privacy protection, and use of matched longitudinal data on employers and employees. Abowd helped to found and continues to provide scientific leadership for the U.S. Census Bureau's Longitudinal Employer-Household Dynamics Program, which integrates censuses, demographic surveys, economic surveys, and administrative data to produce research and public-use data.

Abowd's other research interests include network models for integrated labor market data; statistical methods for confidentiality protection of microdata, including the creation of synthetic data; international comparisons of labor market outcomes; executive compensation; bargaining and other wage-setting institutions; and the econometric tools of labor market analysis.

Major contributions to economics 

Abowd has published a large number of articles on a variety of subjects in labor economics. His work has appeared in the American Economic Review, Econometrica, the Review of Economics and Statistics, the Quarterly Journal of Economics, the Journal of the American Statistical Association, the Journal of Business and Economic Statistics, the Journal of Econometrics, and other major economics and statistics journals.

Among Abowd's most influential articles was "High Wage Workers and High Wage Firms", in which Abowd, Francis Kramarz, and David Margolis used a matched sample of French employees and employers to decompose annual compensation into components related to observable employee characteristics, personal heterogeneity, firm heterogeneity, and residual variation. Their econometric approach, now widely referred to as the "AKM decomposition," laid the groundwork for a large body of subsequent research using employee-employer linked data in labor economics to understand topics including inter-industry wage differentials, firm size-wage effects, and job search and matching in the labor market.

In other widely cited work with David Card, Abowd used longitudinal data to analyze changes in individual earnings and hours over time. Abowd and Card explored the covariance structure of earnings and hours and interpreted them in the context of a life-cycle model of labor supply.

Abowd also has written extensively on executive compensation, and in particular on whether performance-based compensation affects corporate performance.

References

External links 
 
 John M. Abowd's personal website
 John M. Abowd's Cornell University website
 John M. Abowd's National Bureau of Economic Research website
 John M. Abowd's IZA website
 
 John M. Abowd's RePEc website

1951 births
21st-century American economists
20th-century American economists
Cornell University faculty
Labor economists
Living people
University of Chicago alumni
Notre Dame College of Arts and Letters alumni
Fellows of the Econometric Society
Fellows of the American Statistical Association
National Bureau of Economic Research